Frank Borkowski  is a German judo athlete, who competed for the SC Dynamo Hoppegarten / Sportvereinigung (SV) Dynamo. He won the European bronze medal, in 1990. He was the last GDR-Champion.

References 

German male judoka
Living people
Year of birth missing (living people)